Dzitbalché is a large town in the extreme northern part of the Mexican state of Campeche. It is located at 20.32°N 90.05°W and serves as the municipal seat for the municipality of the same name. As of 2010, Dzitbalché had a population of 11,686, up from 10,951 at the 2005 census, making it the sixth-largest community in the state. Before the creation of the municipality of Dzitbalché on 1 January 2021, it was the second-largest community in the municipality of Calkiní.

Climate

References
Link to tables of population data from Census of 2005 INEGI: Instituto Nacional de Estadística, Geografía e Informática

External links
Transparencia de la Ciudad de Calkiní Official website of Municipality of Calkiní

See also

Songs of Dzitbalche

Populated places in Campeche